Pasi Sathya is an Indian actress who has worked predominantly in Tamil cinema and television. She has worked in popular movies like Veedu, Magalir Mattum, Pudhupettai.
She made her debut in the National award-winning Tamil film, Pasi, in 1979. She played Chellamma, a friend of Shoba, who played the main lead role. After the film, she has used the prefix Pasi. Sathya debuted in Netru Indru Naalai. The film was released in 1974. It has been more than 40 years since she came to the cinema and she has acted in over 250 films and 2000 stage plays.

Early career 
Sathya's hometown is Madurai. Her mother is a music teacher and her dad, a central government employee. Her acting journey began with the Pavalakodi drama. She acted in several plays in school. Then she came to Chennai and focused on plays. She was not interested in studies after 9th grade. She has acted in several plays in the presence of great actors including MGR and Sivaji. Sathya has appeared in more than 2,000 stage plays.

Film career 
The veteran actress P. Bhanumathi Ramakrishna who enjoyed her performance gave her the nickname as Pasi Sathya. She is known for his role as a character actor in Tamil cinema. Despite being a talented artist, She is not overlooked. She played a nurse in the 1999 musical romantic comedy film, Poovellam Kettuppar. She was also part of the 2001 Tamil romantic film, Shahjahan. In 2003, Sathya also acted in Kamal Haasan-starrer Anbe Sivam. Other films under her credit are Veeran Veluthambi (1987), Vellaiya Thevan (1990), Patthathu Raani (1992), Magalir Mattum (1994), Nila, Sindhu Nathi Poo (1994), Thirumoorthy (1995), H2O (2002), Engal Anna (2004), Sukran (2005), Kadhalil Vizhunthen (2008), and a lot more.

Family 
Sathya's husband is a retired government employee and she has two children.

Awards and honours 
The Tamil Nadu Government has awarded her the Kalaimamani award. The South Indian Artists Association awarded her the Kalaichelvam award.

Television career 
She is currently acting in Tamil TV series. Pasi Sathya also acted on television and played as Vijay Sarathy's mother in the 1999 Tamil soap opera, Chithi. The same year, she was seen as Maya in9 Raadhika Sarathkumar's drama series, Chellame. In 2002, she earned praises for her performance on Sun TV's Tamil television serial, Annamalai. She also bagged a role on Sun TV's Tamil soap, Ilavarasi. even she acted in, Nimmathi Ungal Choice 2 on sun TV and Kasalavu Nesam as comic role and character roles in Oru Pennin Kadhai  on DD Podhigai,sorgam on Sun TV and Vairanenjam on Kalaignar TV where Vairanenjam has dubbed as aadajanma on Star Maa and Swarna Manasu on Asianet.currently playing supporting role in Poove Unakkaga on Sun TV

Filmography 
This is a partial filmography. You can expand it.

References

External links 
 

Tamil actresses
Indian film actresses
Indian television actresses
Actresses in Tamil cinema
20th-century Indian actresses
21st-century Indian actresses
Tamil television actresses
Actresses in Tamil television
Year of birth missing (living people)
Living people